Friendship is an album by jazz saxophonist Perico Sambeat.

Background
This was Sambeat's first recording as leader for ACT Music. He was also the producer.

Music and recording
The album was recorded at Knoop Studio, River Edge, New Jersey, in February 2003. All but one track ("Crazy She Calls Me") is a Sambeat original. Carmen Canela sings in Portuguese on one track.

Reception
The Penguin Guide to Jazz suggested that the tracks were too similar and that more of Sambeat on soprano instead of alto sax would have helped this. BBC Music Magazine commented that "Mehldau, away from his own records, is free simply to play excellent piano", and "this is an often riveting sequence of originals".

Track listing
All compositions by Perico Sambeat, except track 7.

"Memoria de un sueño" – 08:00
"Orbis" – 07:25
"Bioy" – 07:36
"Eterna" – 04:54
"Icaro" – 07:34
"Mirall" – 05:36
"Crazy She Calls Me" – 05:44
"Actors" – 05:03
"Matilda" – 07:34
"Iris" – 2:08

Personnel
 Perico Sambeat – alto sax, soprano sax
 Brad Mehldau – piano
 Kurt Rosenwinkel – guitar
 Ben Street – bass
 Jeff Ballard – drums
 Carmen Canela – vocals

References

2003 albums
Perico Sambeat albums
ACT Music albums